The LD&ECR class C (LNER Class G3) was a class of 0-4-4T steam locomotives of the Lancashire, Derbyshire and East Coast Railway.

Six were built in 1897–98. They were the LD&ECR's only true passenger locomotives. In later years five moved to the Sheffield area, with one transferring to Ardsley

All were scrapped between 1931 and 1935.

References

Sources

External links

C
0-4-4T locomotives
Kitson locomotives
Railway locomotives introduced in 1895
Scrapped locomotives
Standard gauge steam locomotives of Great Britain

Passenger locomotives